Men of War: Assault Squad 2 (or Behind Enemy Lines 2: Assault 2) is a real-time tactics and real-time strategy game set in World War II. It is a sequel to the 2011 game Men of War: Assault Squad. The early access version of the game was released on March 20, 2014. It was fully released on May 15, 2014.

Men of War: Assault Squad 2 features single player skirmish modes that take players from large scale tank combat to  sniper stealth missions.

Reception

Men of War: Assault Squad 2 has received "mixed" reviews according to reviews aggregator Metacritic, garnering a score of 68/100.

PC Gamer US gave the game a score of 75/100, praising its difficulty.

References

External links

Men of War: Assault Squad 2 on Steam

2014 video games
1C Company games
Real-time strategy video games
Video games developed in Germany
Video games set in Algeria
Video games set in Belgium
Video games set in China
Video games set in the Federated States of Micronesia
Video games set in France
Video games set in Germany
Video games set in Hungary
Video games set in Italy
Video games set in Japan
Video games set in Kiribati
Video games set in Libya
Video games set in Mongolia
Video games set in Myanmar
Video games set in the Netherlands
Video games set in Oceania
Video games set in Okinawa Prefecture
Video games set in Palau
Video games set in Papua New Guinea
Video games set in the Philippines
Video games set in Russia
Video games set in Singapore
Video games set in the Soviet Union
Video games set in Ukraine
World War II video games
Windows-only games
Windows games
Pacific War video games
Multiplayer and single-player video games
Video games with Steam Workshop support